This is a list of the best-selling albums in Argentina based on CAPIF certification. Albums are listed in order of certification (highest to lowest), and order of release date (earliest to most recent). This list contains any type of album, including studio, greatest hits, compilation, various artists, soundtrack, DVDs and remix.

Historical accreditation levels

Albums

DVD

2× Diamond

Diamond

10—16× Platinum

8× Platinum

7× platinum

6× Platinum

5× Platinum

Highest certified video and DVD albums

See also 

 List of best-selling albums
 List of best-selling music artists
 List of best-selling singles

References

External links 
 CAPIF Website

Argentine record charts
Argentina